Streptomyces hoynatensis is a bacterium species from the genus of Streptomyces which has been isolated from marine sediment from the Black Sea in Turkey.

See also 
 List of Streptomyces species

References

Further reading

External links
Type strain of Streptomyces hoynatensis at BacDive -  the Bacterial Diversity Metadatabase

hoynatensis
Bacteria described in 2014